Kathleen Funchion (born 22 April 1981) is an Irish Sinn Féin politician who has been a Teachta Dála (TD) for the Carlow–Kilkenny constituency since the 2016 general election. She was appointed Chair of the Committee on Children, Disability, Equality and Integration in September 2020. She previously served as Chair of the Committee on the Implementation of the Good Friday Agreement from 2016 to 2020. 

She is the Sinn Féin Spokesperson on Children, Disabilities, Integration and Equality.

In the 32nd Dáil, she served Chair of the Committee on the Implementation of the Good Friday Agreement. In the 33rd Dáil, she was appointed Chair of the Committee on Children, Disability, Equality and Integration.

She was a member of Kilkenny Borough Council from 2009 to 2014 and Kilkenny County Council from 2014 to 2016, after her election to the Dáil. Prior to her election, she worked with the SIPTU trade union. 

She was married to David Cullinane who is the Sinn Féin TD for Waterford.

See also
Families in the Oireachtas

References

External links
Kathleen Funchion's page on the Sinn Féin website

Living people
1981 births
Local councillors in County Kilkenny
Members of the 32nd Dáil
Sinn Féin TDs (post-1923)
Spouses of Irish politicians
People from Kilkenny (city)
Alumni of the American College Dublin
Members of the 33rd Dáil
21st-century women Teachtaí Dála